The 6th Madras Native Infantry could refer to the:

1st Battalion which became the 66th Punjabis
2nd Battalion which became the 74th Punjabis